is a series of adventure and action role-playing games for the arcade and various Nintendo video game systems. The plot of several of the games follow two young boys, Jack and Ryu, as they adventure through their home, Chinaland.

Each of the games in the series were developed by Culture Brain, the earlier games developed by Nihon Game, a name the company used before Culture Brain. The games that were released in North America were retitled, such as Super Chinese, which became Kung Fu Heroes. Many of the games were not released outside Japan.

Overview

Common elements
In most of the Super Chinese games, Jack and Ryu are the protagonists. They often are fighting to save their homeland, Chinaland.

Gameplay
The earliest Super Chinese games included action game elements, such as Kung Fu Heroes and Super Chinese Land. The later games in the series, such as Super Ninja Boy also integrated role-playing video game elements into the gameplay. The playable characters gain experience points from action RPG, random encounter battles and increase in levels, becoming more powerful.

Video games

The Super Chinese series is made up of several video games spanning many of Nintendo's earlier systems. Super Chinese, Super Chinese Land, and Super Chinese World are the three main groups in the series. Chinese Hero was the first video game in the series. Even though Culture Brain (then known as Nihon Game) wasn't mentioned in any part of the game while its publisher Taito was, Chinese Hero was developed by Culture Brain without credit. The Fighter video games are fighting games that allow players to fight with characters from the series, such as Ryu and Jack.

In North America, the series is mostly known as the Ninja Boy series. Ninja Boy, Ninja Boy II, and Super Ninja Boy were all released in North America, as well as Kung Fu Heroes. While the two protagonists are Kung fu practitioners in the original version fitting the Chinese setting, their designs were slightly altered to make them into ninja for the North American market.

Other releases and remakes:

Super Chinese Land 1-2-3 Dash (09/13/1996)
Super Chinese I+II Advance (06/24/2004)
Twin Series Vol.3: Konchuu Monster + Super Chinese Labyrinth (12/10/2004)

Super Chinese Land 1-2-3 Dash and Super Chinese I+II Advance are compilations of earlier video games in the series.

References

External links
Super Chinese at MobyGames

 
Role-playing video games
Video game franchises
Wuxia video games